Manoba terminalis is a moth in the  family Nolidae. It was described by Rothschild in 1912. It is found in New Guinea.

References

Natural History Museum Lepidoptera generic names catalog

Moths described in 1912
Nolinae